Jared Schmidt (born 18 April 1997) is a Canadian freestyle skier who competes internationally in the ski cross discipline.

Career
Schmidt has been part of the national team since 2018.

Schmidt has won two World Cup medals, both bronzes. The first one came in February 2021, in Bakurani, Georgia, with the second one coming in December 2021.

On January 24, 2022, Schmidt was named to Canada's 2022 Olympic team along with his sister Hannah Schmidt, who also competed in the women's ski cross event.

References

External links 
 

1997 births
Living people
Canadian male freestyle skiers
Skiers from Ottawa
Freestyle skiers at the 2022 Winter Olympics
Olympic freestyle skiers of Canada